The second term of Arnold Schwarzenegger as governor of California began on January 5, 2007 and ended on January 3, 2011. On November 7, 2006, the Republican incumbent Arnold Schwarzenegger defeated Democratic state treasurer Phil Angelides in the California gubernatorial election to win a second term as governor of California. Now in his new term, Schwarzenegger pledged to be a centrist politician and cooperate with the Democrats to resolve statewide political issues. Only days into the term, the governor proposed universal health insurance in the state and called for new bonds for schools, prisons, and other infrastructure. In May 2007, Schwarzenegger met with two of his counterparts in Canada, Dalton McGuinty and Gordon Campbell, in order to address climate change and advocate for stem cell research. An oil spill occurred in November when the Cosco Busan struck the San Francisco–Oakland Bay Bridge.

In 2008, Schwarzenegger proposed a balanced budget amendment to the state constitution. The governor also proposed an austere fiscal policy in response to the Great Recession. In the United States presidential election, Schwarzenegger endorsed John McCain. Continuing his efforts to address environmental issues, the governor signed a memorandum of understanding with Mexican President Felipe Calderón and signed legislation pertaining to global warming. However, by October, Schwarzenegger vetoed 35 percent of the bills that the California State Legislature passed, which was the highest the rate had ever been since the statistic was first tracked when Ronald Reagan was governor of the state. In the election, voters approved Proposition 11, which shifted redistricting powers away from the legislature and created the California Citizens Redistricting Commission.

In the midst of the Great Recession in 2009, Schwarzenegger called upon the legislature to pass deep budget cuts and warned that the state was facing insolvency. At the same time, the governor approved of President Barack Obama's federal stimulus bill. Schwarzenegger appointed Laura Chick as inspector general to oversee California's share of the stimulus bill. In May, the governor voiced his support for marijuana legalization and a special election resulted in all but one of the state's propositions being rejected.

Election 

In February 2006, Steve Schmidt and Matthew Dowd were respectively named the campaign manager and chief strategist for Schwarzenegger's reelection campaign. On April 14, Schwarzenegger's reelection campaign released his federal and state tax returns for 2002–2004 after State Controller Steve Westly and State Treasurer Phil Angelides, both Democrats, released theirs. On June 6, Schwarzenegger won nearly 90 percent of the vote in the Republican gubernatorial primary election without serious opposition. On September 13, Angelides admitted to leaking a controversial tape of Schwarzenegger to the media. Katie Levinson, the communications director for the Schwarzenegger campaign called the action "unethical at best, criminal at worst". On October 7, Schwarzenegger participated in a debate with Angelides. On October 12, Schwarzenegger appeared on The Tonight Show with Jay Leno, which drew criticism because Angelides was not included. While the Democratic Party gained six governorships in the 2006 elections, Schwarzenegger managed to defeat Angelides on November 7.

Second term

2007 

Schwarzenegger was inaugurated on January 5, 2007 and pledged to work as a centrist by creating an era of "post-partisanship" that will bring all Californians together to solve the state's problems. On January 8, Schwarzenegger proposed a system of universal health insurance for Californians. The governor gave his fourth annual State of the State address on January 9, calling for $43.3 billion in new bond spending for schools, prisons, and other infrastructure. Schwarzenegger declared a state of emergency in ten counties on January 16 after freezing weather damaged California farmers' crops, causing up to $1 billion in damages. On February 20, Sacramento Superior Court judge Gail Ohanesian ruled that Schwarzenegger inappropriately invoked the state of emergency regarding prisons, blocking officials from transferring prison inmates to private prisons in other U.S. states. Schwarzenegger signed a bill on March 15 that moved California's presidential primary from June to February 2008.

On March 20, Schwarzenegger called conservative talk show host Rush Limbaugh "irrelevant" after Limbaugh said Schwarzenegger seemed like a Democrat in his policies on energy, stem cell research, and health care. Schwarzenegger appointed David Long, Riverside County's superintendent of schools since 1999, as the new secretary of education. While giving a speech at a school on March 30 in Delano, California, where he was paying tribute to the late Cesar Chavez, a girl fainted, which caused him to stop mid-speech to help her off the platform. He then quipped, "Okay everybody who's standing back here loosen up your knees. Don't stand with stiff knees okay, because that's how you faint. Loosen up and relax." On April 8, the Conservative Party (UK) announced that Schwarzenegger would address the annual conference of the party, which was to be held between September 30 and October 3.

On April 11, Schwarzenegger gave a speech at a conference in Washington, D.C., where he said, "For too long the environmental movement was powered by guilt, and that doesn't work. The movement can't nag or scold, but must be a positive force." Schwarzenegger also said the environmental movement must become "hip and sexy" if it is to succeed. On April 25, Schwarzenegger threatened to sue the United States Environmental Protection Agency if it failed to act soon on a state bid to crack down on greenhouse gas emissions from cars. The California State Legislature approved the largest single prison construction program in U.S. history and agreed to send 8,000 convicts to other states on April 26. On April 30, Schwarzenegger declared a state of emergency after a highway collapse in Oakland, authorizing free transit on the Bay Area Rapid Transit rail system, ferries, and buses for one day. The bill that was earlier passed by the legislature, which costs between $7.8 to $8.3 billion and adds 53,000 beds to California's prison and county jails, was signed into law by Schwarzenegger on May 3.

On May 9, Schwarzenegger's office announced that eleven California-based companies signed contracts worth $3 billion with Chinese companies in a move to expand trade between the U.S. state and China. At MacArthur Maze on May 24, Schwarzenegger congratulated the construction workers for reopening the freeway within a month. Schwarzenegger met Ontario premier Dalton McGuinty on May 30, when the two signed deals to fight climate change and boost stem cell research. The governor then met Canadian Prime Minister Stephen Harper, who he swapped hockey jerseys with. On May 31, Schwarzenegger and British Columbia premier Gordon Campbell signed a memorandum of understanding on climate change in Vancouver, setting targets for greenhouse gas emissions below 1990 levels.

At the annual convention of the National Association of Hispanic Journalists on June 15, Schwarzenegger said that immigrants should avoid Spanish-language media if they wanted to learn English quickly. On June 25, Schwarzenegger met French President Nicolas Sarkozy at the Élysée Palace to discuss the fight against global warming. On the next day, Schwarzenegger visited London, where he met Tony Blair on the latter's final full day in office as Prime Minister, and issued a plea for countries to join the fight against global warming. On July 12, Schwarzenegger met with Bay Area executives, asking them to support his health care reform plan, while deriding a Democratic alternative and single-payer healthcare. Schwarzenegger met with United Nations Secretary-General Ban Ki-moon on July 27, when the latter invited him to attend a UN meeting on climate change on September 24, which Schwarzenegger accepted.

On August 17, Schwarzenegger travelled to Beverly Hills, California, to attend the funeral of entertainer Merv Griffin, where he said, "My English wasn't that good at the time—not that it is perfect today—but it was scary to get on his show because it was the first talk show I'd ever done in America. But I tell you that he took really good care of me." Schwarzenegger made 18 judicial appointments on August 20 that included a substantially greater mix of women and minorities after having been sharply criticized earlier in the year for naming mostly white men to the bench. On September 4, Schwarzenegger named former federal prosecutor Paul Seave, a Democrat, to be his new director of gang and youth violence policy. At the California Republican Party convention in Indian Wells on September 7, Schwarzenegger warned his fellow Republicans that "in movie terms, we are dying at the box office. We are not filling the seats."

On September 12, Schwarzenegger vetoed a bill that would have allowed Californians to vote on whether they favor an immediate withdrawal of U.S. troops from Iraq. Schwarzenegger signed a bill on September 13 that banned cell phone use for drivers under the age of 18. On September 24, Schwarzenegger addressed the UN and said rich and poor nations must get over their disagreements about how to fight climate change and forge a new pact to replace the Kyoto Protocol. Via satellite, Schwarzenegger addressed the British Conservative Party on September 30, during which he called opposition leader David Cameron "a new, dynamic leader". For the second time, Schwarzenegger vetoed a bill on October 12 that would have legalized same-sex marriage and said, "I support current domestic partnership rights and will continue to vigorously defend and enforce these rights." On October 14, Schwarzenegger signed bills that banned phthalates in children's products and made California the first U.S. state to require semiautomatic pistols sold in the state to leave a unique imprint on bullets that are fired.

With more than a dozen wildfires raging across southern California on October 22, Schwarzenegger declared a state of emergency in seven counties and reassigned 800 soldiers in the National Guard from patrolling the border to help battle the wildfires as well as calling the situation "a tragic time for California". On October 23, Schwarzenegger said that he was "happy" with the number of firefighters working the blazes, but officials said that they were stretched thin and that a lack of resources was as much a burden as the temperatures and winds. In spite of their differences on policy, Schwarzenegger and George W. Bush travelled to southern California on October 25 to view the scarred landscape by helicopter and Bush telling Californians that they wouldn't be forgotten in Washington, D.C. During a news conference on October 27, Schwarzenegger said that at least two fires were started intentionally and two more had suspicious origins and issued a warning for arsonists, "We will hunt down the people that are responsible for that. If I were one of the people who started the fires, I would not sleep soundly right now, because we're right behind you."

GQ reported on October 29 that Schwarzenegger told Piers Morgan in an interview that "[marijuana] is not a drug, it's a leaf." On October 30, Schwarzenegger met with Uruguayan President Tabaré Vázquez. Schwarzenegger announced on November 8 that he assumed an unspecified backstage role to bring an end to the screenwriters strike. In a news conference in Sacramento, Schwarzenegger said, "I'm talking to the parties that are involved because I think it's very important that we settle that as quickly as possible, because it has a tremendous economic impact on our state." On the same day, Schwarzenegger, with the backing of state Attorney General Jerry Brown, sued the Bush administration and said he was prepared to "sue again and sue again" until California gets permission to impose its own tough standards on automakers to curb global warming.

On November 7, container ship Cosco Busan struck a tower of the San Francisco–Oakland Bay Bridge, causing an oil spill. This led to Schwarzenegger declaring a state of emergency on November 9, saying, "There is tremendous damage on the wildlife and on the beaches. If mistakes were made, then we will bring them out." On November 13, Schwarzenegger issued an order suspending all fishing and crabbing for human consumption in areas affected by the spill until at least December 1. The ban on fishing and crabbing in the San Francisco area was lifted by Schwarzenegger on November 29 after studies showed no ill effects from the oil spill, but state officials urged seafood lovers to stay away from some mussels and oysters. On December 11, Schwarzenegger allowed some financially struggling hospitals to keep operating until 2020 even though the state said they were most likely to crumple during a major seismic event. Schwarzenegger announced on December 20 his plan to sue the federal government over its decision not to allow a California plan to reduce greenhouse gas emissions.

2008 

On January 2, 2008, California sued the EPA, challenging its recent decision to block California rules curbing greenhouse gas emissions from new cars and trucks. Schwarzenegger gave his fifth State of the State address on January 8, proposing a constitutional amendment to keep the state from spending more than it collects in taxes. He also said that his education priority would be to transform 98 school districts that had posted rock-bottom test scores for at least five years. On January 11, Schwarzenegger proposed austerity measures by taking billions of dollars from public schools, temporarily shutting down four-dozen state parks, and releasing tens of thousands of prisoners. At the same time, the governor declared a fiscal emergency and called a special session of the state legislature to trim the current year's spending. On January 15, Schwarzenegger endorsed Proposition 93 in a flip-flop on term limits. On January 24, the State Senate rejected Schwarzenegger's nomination of Judith Case to the California Air Resources Board by a party-line vote of 20–15 after Democratic lawmakers questioned her commitment to fighting for cleaner air. Schwarzenegger endorsed U.S. Senator and Republican presidential candidate John McCain on January 31.

On February 14, Schwarzenegger and Mexican President Felipe Calderón signed a memorandum of understanding to formalize a working relationship on environmental issues such as air-quality monitoring. Schwarzenegger signed six bills on February 16 that aimed at reducing at least part of the state's $14.5 billion deficit that stretches over two fiscal years. On February 19, Schwarzenegger signed an executive order requiring state agencies to make additional spending cuts that total $100 million as part of an effort to help solve the state's fiscal crisis. As part of a bipartisan group of governors on February 24, Schwarzenegger called on George W. Bush, the U.S. Congress, and the presidential candidates to back a major spending program to repair the nation's roads, bridges, rail lines, and water systems. On February 27, Schwarzenegger and state schools chief Jack O'Connell announced a joint plan to help 96 troubled school districts improve academically. Schwarzenegger filed a lawsuit against the United States Forest Service on February 28 for adopting a management plan that would allow road construction and oil drilling in California's largest national forests, saying, "We are forced to once again stand up for California's forests. Despite repeated attempts to ensure that the United States Forest Service honor its written assurances that California's roadless areas would be protected, they have failed to do so."

On March 20, Schwarzenegger removed Clint Eastwood and Bobby Shriver, his brother-in-law, from the state parks commission, where both had served since before Schwarzenegger took office. After the Pacific Fishery Management Council voted on April 10 to cancel the chinook fishing season in an effort to reverse the catastrophic disappearance of California's run of the king salmon, Schwarzenegger declared a state of emergency and sent a letter to George W. Bush asking for his help in obtaining federal disaster assistance. On April 11, Schwarzenegger told a group of gay Republicans that an attempt to ban same-sex marriage by changing the state constitution is a "total waste of time" and promised to oppose such an initiative if it qualifies for the state ballot. At a Yale University climate conference on April 18, Schwarzenegger signed a pledge with 17 other U.S. states to pressure Congress and the next president to quickly adopt aggressive limits on greenhouse gas emissions. On April 24, Schwarzenegger predicted that California would face a budget deficit of more than $10 billion in the upcoming fiscal year.

On May 15, the state Supreme Court, striking down a 1977 law and Proposition 22 in a 4–3 decision, ruled that same-sex couples had a constitutional right to marry. In a statement, Schwarzenegger said that he respected the ruling and did not support a constitutional amendment to overturn it. After U.S. Senator Ted Kennedy was diagnosed with a malignant brain tumor, Schwarzenegger issued a statement with his wife, Kennedy's niece, saying, Maria and I are thankful for everyone's thoughts and prayers today and over the past several days. While we are still learning the extent of Teddy's diagnosis and treatment options, what we do know is that Teddy is an incredibly courageous and tenacious man who will tackle this with the same determination with which he approaches everything in life. I encourage everyone to keep Teddy in their prayers, as we are continuing to do." On May 22, Schwarzenegger spoke at a Silicon Valley forum alongside presumptive Republican presidential nominee John McCain. Schwarzenegger and Nevada governor Jim Gibbons declared a state of emergency in the Lake Tahoe basin on May 27, who took the advice of a two-state commission that declared the region ripe for catastrophic fire.

On June 4, Schwarzenegger issued a drought declaration—the first of its kind since 1991—ordering the transfer of water from less dry areas to those that are dangerously dry. The governor also said he would ask the federal government for aid to farmers and press water districts, cities, and local water agencies to accelerate conservation. In Fresno, California, on June 6, Schwarzenegger met Honduran President Manuel Zelaya, who discussed job offers for Honduran workers. On June 12, Schwarzenegger and Chilean President Michelle Bachelet presided over the signing of a number of bilateral scientific, agricultural, and educational agreements. On the same day, Schwarzenegger declared a state of emergency in nine counties over the drought, ordering several state agencies to help drill wells, use the California Aqueduct to transport water to farmers, and to expedite water transfers between agencies. After McCain called for an end to the federal ban on offshore drilling on June 16, Schwarzenegger and other governors promised on June 18 to block attempts to tap offshore petroleum reserves, citing concerns about the environment and tourism. In a taped interview on Meet the Press on June 29, Schwarzenegger defended McCain, calling him "the real deal on the environment".

On July 9, Schwarzenegger signed a bill that aimed to keep many homeowners from losing their properties to foreclosure. Schwarzenegger signed a bill on July 25 that made California the first U.S. state to ban trans fats in restaurant food. On July 31, Schwarzenegger ordered pay for up to 200,000 state workers cut to minimum wage and laid off more than 10,000 others, blaming a looming cash crisis. Schwarzenegger proposed a one-cent sales tax increase on August 4, framing it as a temporary sacrifice to be recouped by Californians in years to come. On August 6, Schwarzenegger said that he wouldn't sign any bills until the legislature passed a budget. Schwarzenegger sued Controller John Chiang on August 11, aiming to force the unpaid furlough of 15,600 more state workers two days a month. On August 16, the powers of governor were temporarily transferred to Lieutenant Governor John Garamendi while Schwarzenegger underwent knee surgery. Even though he earlier promised to not sign any bills, Schwarzenegger signed a measure on August 26 for a statewide bullet train system that he strongly supported.

On September 23, Schwarzenegger signed the state's budget, ending an 85-day deadlock over how to close the state's $15.2 billion deficit. Schwarzenegger signed a bill on September 24 that made it illegal to read or send text messages while driving in California. On September 27, Schwarzenegger signed and vetoed about a hundred bills each, facing a September 30 deadline at which unsigned bills automatically became law. On the next day, Schwarzenegger vetoed 131 bills, twice as many as he had signed. On September 29, Schwarzenegger signed several bills that aimed to speed response and improve cleanup efforts after a major oil spill. Before the midnight deadline, Schwarzenegger signed bills on September 30, one of which aimed at helping the state fight global warming by better coordinating local planning efforts to curb suburban sprawl.

By October, Schwarzenegger declined to sign 415 of the 1,187 bills that had appeared on his desk in 2008, a rate of 35 percent, the highest since state officials began keeping that statistic when Ronald Reagan was governor. On October 27, Schwarzenegger said he would call a special legislative session to address the state's budget a day after the November 4 elections. After the passage of Proposition 11, Schwarzenegger declared victory, saying, "This is why this is historic—the first time where really citizens independently of the Legislature...will draw the district lines in the future." On November 14, Schwarzenegger signed an executive order directing state agencies to study the effects of global warming and recommend how the state needs to adapt to such changes in land use planning and building new infrastructure.

On December 1, Schwarzenegger declared a fiscal emergency, calling for fast legislative action to alleviate the state's $11.2 billion shortfall in revenue, "Without immediate action our state is headed for a fiscal disaster and that is why with more than two dozen new legislators sworn in today—I am wasting no time in calling a fiscal emergency special session." After the California Air Resources Board voted unanimously to adopt the nation's most comprehensive anti-global warming plan on December 11, Schwarzenegger said that California was providing a road map for the rest of the country. On December 18, Schwarzenegger promised to veto a budget bill that he said would cut spending too little, raise taxes and fees too much, and shortchange economic stimulus programs. Schwarzenegger called on the legislature on December 19 to convene a new special legislative session to address the state's fiscal crisis and ordered layoffs and mandatory unpaid time off for state workers as a money-saving measure.

2009 
On January 6, 2009, Schwarzenegger vetoed an $18 billion deficit-cutting package with his spokesperson saying that it did not meet the governor's demands for making more cuts, streamlining government, and creating an economic stimulus. In a January 7 news conference, Schwarzenegger said, "I cannot go out and get Republican votes when I wouldn't vote for it." On January 15, Schwarzenegger gave an unusually terse State of the State address in which he warned that the legislature must agree on a budget solution before the state faced insolvency. Schwarzenegger travelled to Washington, D.C. to attend the first inauguration of Barack Obama on January 20. After being refused a waiver from less-stringent national standards in 2007, President Obama ordered his environmental officials on January 26 to immediately review California's regulation, a move that was praised by Schwarzenegger as "a great victory for California and for cleaning the air around the nation for generations to come". On January 28, Schwarzenegger threatened to dismiss state workers if a judge or employee unions blocked his plan to furlough thousands of workers two days a month beginning the next week. After a judge ruled on January 29 that the governor had the legal authority to order workers to take time off without pay, Schwarzenegger told statewide elected officials on January 30 furlough state workers two days a month.

On February 6, more than 200,000 state employees had to take the day off without pay to help ease California's budget crisis. Schwarzenegger signed a budget bill on February 20 raising $12.8 billion in new taxes. On February 20, Schwarzenegger called the federal stimulus plan a "terrific package" and said he was "more than happy" to take money from any governor that declined to accept aid from the stimulus. Schwarzenegger declared a state of emergency on February 27 because of three years of below-average rain and snowfall in California, a step that urges urban water agencies to reduce water use by 20 percent. On March 3, Schwarzenegger and German Chancellor Angela Merkel toured CeBIT in Hanover. Because of a controversy about accepting speaking fees, California State and Consumer Services Agency (SCSA) secretary Rosario Marin resigned from her post on March 5. On March 18, Schwarzenegger introduced Obama at a town hall meeting in Los Angeles. On the same day, Schwarzenegger appointed former Assemblyman Fred Aguiar as secretary of the SCSA. On March 27, Schwarzenegger signed five bills that would allow California to receive more than $17.5 billion in federal economic stimulus aid.

On April 3, Schwarzenegger appointed Laura Chick to the newly created office of inspector general to oversee its share of the $787 billion from the federal economic stimulus package. It was reported on April 12 that Schwarzenegger and Pennsylvania Governor Ed Rendell sent a private memo to Obama saying he needs to assert more political leadership instead of leaving it to Congress to draft a plan for improving the nation's aging highways, bridges, and ports. In an appearance with Schwarzenegger, U.S. Interior Secretary Ken Salazar urged California on April 15 to modernize its antiquated water system while pledging $260 million in federal stimulus money to help fund a variety of water projects.

Schwarzenegger said on May 6 that it was time to debate legalizing marijuana for recreational use in California. On May 14, Schwarzenegger unveiled a budget proposal planning to close a huge budget deficit with deeper cuts in education and health programs and by borrowing billions more dollars. Schwarzenegger travelled to Washington, D.C. on May 19 to celebrate a victory on clean air with Obama while his budget reform initiatives in the 2009 special election were appearing to be heading for defeat.

On November 16, Schwarzenegger visited Camp Victory in Iraq to thank the soldiers, reminded them to exercise, and handed out cigars.

2010–2011 

Schwarzenegger was in Baghdad on March 17, 2010, when he praised U.S. soldiers for helping Iraqi Prime Minister Nouri al-Maliki build and nurture Iraq's public institutions.

See also 
 First term of Arnold Schwarzenegger as governor of California
 Opinion polling on the Arnold Schwarzenegger governorship

References 

2000s in California
Arnold Schwarzenegger
Schwarzenegger, Arnold
Schwarzenegger 2